Hadmar II of Kuenring (c. 1140 – 22 July 1217) was an Austrian ministerialis of the Kuenring family and son of Albero III of Kuenring. In 1192 he held captive Richard the Lionheart, King of England, at Dürnstein Castle. 

Hadmar II also erected from 1201 to 1208 the city of Weitra. Because of the creation of this city, they are sometimes referred to in documents as "Lords of Kuenring-Weitra".

Hadmar is mentioned in the Stifterbuch (Liber fundatorum; the cartulary of Zwettl Abbey) as second founder (secundus fundator) of the monastery. 

Hadmar's sister Gisela (d. after 1192) was married to Leutwin of Sunnberg.

Literature
 Die Kuenringer - Das Werden des Landes Niederösterreich, Katalog zur Niederösterreichischen Landesausstellung 1981, Herausgeber und Verleger: Amt der Niederösterreichischen Landesregierung, Abt. III/2 - Kulturabteilung, 2. verbesserte Auflage

Issue
Hadmar II of Kuenring had four children:
Albero IV of Kuenring, died childless after 1220
Hadmar III of Kuenring  
Henry I of Kuenring married Adelheid of Falkenstein-Neuburg
Gisela, married Ulrich of Falkenstein

Notes

References

External links
 Hadmar II. von Kuenring at gedaechtnisdeslandes.at (in German)

Hadmar II of Kuenring
Hadmar II of Kuenring
Christians of the Fifth Crusade
Austrian Christians